Where There's a Will may refer to:

In film and television:
 Where There's a Will (1936 film), a British comedy starring Will Hay
 Where There's a Will (1955 film), a British comedy starring George Cole
 Where There's a Will (2006 film), an American television film
 "Where There's a Will" (Big Love), an episode of Big Love
 "Where There's a Will..." (Cheers), an episode of Cheers
 "Where There's a Will" (The Goodies) or "Hunting Pink", an episode of The Goodies
 "Where There's a Will" (L.A. Law),  an episode of L.A. Law
  
In literature:
 Where There's a Will (novel), a 1940 novel by Rex Stout
 Where There's a Will, a 1912 novel by Mary Roberts Rinehart

In music:
 "Where There's a Will", a song by John Cale from Caribbean Sunset
 "In the Beginning There Was Rhythm / Where There's a Will...", 1980 split-single by The Pop Group and The Slits